Kiga (also called Rukiga, Ruchiga, or Chiga) is a Great Lakes Bantu language of the Kiga people (Bakiga). Kiga is a similar and partially mutually intelligible with the Nkore language. It was first written in the second half of the 19th century.
Kiga is largely spoken in the ancient Kigezi region which includes about 5 districts, namely Rubanda, Rukiga, Kabale, Kanungu and some parts of Rukungiri.
As of 2021, Kiga is spoken natively by about 1.3 million people in Uganda.

Kiga is so similar to Nkore (84%–94% lexical similarity) that some argue they are dialects of the same language, called Nkore-Kiga by Charles Taylor.

Phonology 

 Sounds /i, u/ can also range to [ɪ, ʊ] when short or lax.
 /a/ can range from a central [ä] to a back [ɑ] sound.

 /r/ can also be heard as a glide [ɹ] in free variation.
 /b/ can be heard as [ʋ] in intervocalic positions.

Orthography
 a - [a]
 b - [b]
 ch/c - [t͡ʃ]
 d - [d]
 e - [ɛ]
 f - [f]
 g - [g/gʲ]
 h - [h]
 i - [i]
 j - [d͡ʒ]
 k - [k/kʲ]
 m - [m]
 n - [n]
 ny - [ɲ]
 o - [ɔ]
 p - [p]
 r - [r]
 s - [s]
 t - [t]
 ts - [t͡s]
 u - [u]
 v - [v]
 w - [w]
 y - [j]
 z - [z]

D and P are only used in foreign names and loanwords.

G and K are palatalised before I.

 ai - [ai̯]
 ei - [ɛi̯]
 gy - [ɟ]
 ky - [c]
 mp - [ᵐp]
 mw - [ᵐw]
 nd - [ⁿd]
 ng - [ŋ]
 oi - [ɔi̯]
 sh - [ʃ]

Grammar

In common with other Bantu languages, Kiga has a noun class system in which prefixes on nouns mark membership of one of the noun genders. Pronouns, adjectives, and verbs reflect the noun gender of the nominal they refer to. Some examples of noun classes:
 mu – person (singular), e.g. omukiga = inhabitant of Kigezi land
 ru – language, e.g. Rukiga = language of the Kiga
 ba – people, e.g. Bakiga = The Kiga people
 ki – customs or traditions, e.g. kikiga, (sometimes spelled Kichiga), describes religious tradition common to the Kiga people.  Sometimes the people are called 'Chiga' by people misunderstanding the linguistic rules in relation to the prefixes.

The sound  is not distinctive in Rukiga.  The letter "r" is used instead.

See also
Runyakitara language
Nkore-Kiga

References

Languages of Uganda
Nyoro-Ganda languages